Schwefelbach is a river in Saxony-Anhalt, Germany that flows into the Selke in Alexisbad.

See also
List of rivers of Saxony-Anhalt

Rivers of Saxony-Anhalt
Rivers of Germany